Vincent Moore (born April 14, 1964) is an American guitarist and a member of the British hard rock band UFO.

Biography 
Moore was born in New Castle, Delaware. He began his professional career at age 12 after receiving a guitar as a Christmas present.  During a 2018 interview, Moore stated, "I got my first guitar for Christmas when I was like 12, basically just because I saw a picture of a guitar in a catalog, a JCPenney's catalog.  I thought, 'Hey that looks pretty cool.  I want that.'  That was my motivation at the time, and I got it for Christmas, and really didn't bother with it a whole lot.  Then, I started taking lessons for the next year.  Then I really started to get obsessed with it."  During that same interview, Moore was asked  who his earliest teachers were, and he stated, "The first teacher was Mary Biddle, and I studied for a year with her, just some basic lessons at the local music shop.  After about a year, I had advanced, and she referred me to another guy named Nick Bucci, who was a great player in my local area.  He was studying jazz guitar with Pat Martino, and was also a rock guy, and he just taught me a lot of stuff; theory, and exercises, and all different kinds of stuff to make me become a better player and musician."  Moore played clubs and bars until Shrapnel executive Mike Varney discovered him via a demo and biography that Moore submitted to the Spotlight column, which Varney headed for Guitar Player. His connection to Varney led to an opportunity to appear in a Pepsi commercial in 1985 (only Vinnie's hands appeared in the commercial as his guitar playing is heard). Following this, Moore recorded his first solo album, Mind's Eye (1986), released on Shrapnel Records and featuring Tony MacAlpine on keyboards. The album received several awards from guitar magazines and sold over 100,000 copies.

Moore played lead guitar with the heavy metal band Vicious Rumors on their debut album, Soldiers of the Night (1985). The album featured Moore's solo-song "Invader", which was in the style of Van Halen's "Eruption". The shred guitar craze of the late 1980s led to more releases for Shrapnel. Moore also began performing with other hard rock and heavy metal bands.

Moore joined Alice Cooper's band for a tour and then appeared on the Hey Stoopid (1991) album. Moore released two instructional videos on guitar playing.

Moore has been the lead guitarist for UFO since June 2003, releasing his first studio album with them You Are Here the following year. This has been followed by The Monkey Puzzle (2006), The Visitor (2009), Seven Deadly (2012) and A Conspiracy of Stars (2015).

On August 5, 2013, Moore came on stage to perform live with Peter Frampton on Frampton's Guitar Circus concert at Musikfest in Bethlehem, Pennsylvania.

Moore played guitar on Red Zone Rider's debut album Red Zone Rider released on September 16, 2014.

Equipment 
Vinnie Moore is currently endorsed by Kramer guitars.
Moore was previously endorsed by Dean guitars, with whom he has several signature models.  Prior to his endorsement with Dean, he used guitars made by various other brands over the years including Ibanez and Fender, most notably the Talon model that was manufactured by Heartfield, one of Fender's sub brands.  Moore also currently uses ENGL amplifiers and DiMarzio pickups.

Discography

Discography

Compilation albums

Live albums

Instructional videos

Other appearances

References

External links 

 Official website

1964 births
Living people
Lead guitarists
American heavy metal guitarists
People from New Castle, Delaware
UFO (band) members
20th-century American guitarists
Shrapnel Records artists